Bhadaur Assembly constituency (Sl. No.: 102) is a Punjab Legislative Assembly constituency in Barnala district, Punjab state, India. Labh Singh Ugoke represents the constituency in Punjab assembly since 2022.

Members of the Legislative Assembly

Election Results

2022 
:

2017

Previous Results

References

External links
 

Assembly constituencies of Punjab, India
Barnala district